Colobothea declivis is a species of beetle in the family Cerambycidae. It was described by Per Olof Christopher Aurivillius in 1902 and is known from Bolivia.

References

declivis
Beetles described in 1902
Beetles of South America